An equity-linked note (ELN) is a debt instrument, usually a bond, that differs from a standard fixed-income security in that the final payout is based on the return of the underlying equity, which can be a single stock, basket of stocks, or an equity index. Equity-linked notes are a type of structured products. 

Most equity-linked notes are not traded on the secondary market and are designed to be kept to maturity. However, the issuer or arranger of the notes may offer to buy back the notes. Unlike the maturity payout, the buy-back price before maturity may be below the amount invested in first place.

Equity-linked notes can be referred to one of the following:

Equity-linked put option
An equity-linked put option (ELPO) is a structured product composed of a deposit, and a short put option.

The underlying stock, exercise price and maturity date determine the principal and interest of the product. The face value of the product is the exercise price times the trading unit, for example, if the exercise price is $100 and the product is sold at 100 shares per lot, the face value of the product is $10000.

The product is sold at a discount, which is the option premium received by selling the put option. Using the example above, if the option premium is $2 (per share), the product is then sold at $9800.

On the expiry day, if the stock is trading at or above the exercise price, the option is not exercised and the investor receives the full face value of the product ($10000 in the example). However, if the stock is trading below the exercise price, the investor receives the stock instead.

Principal-guaranteed notes
A principal-guaranteed note (PGN) is a structured product composed of a zero-coupon bond and a long option, which may be a call option or put option. The product is principal-protected, i.e. the investor is guaranteed to receive at least 100% of the original amount. 

The product is sold at the face value, where the discount on the zero-coupon bond is used to buy an option. If the underlying product goes in favour of the investor, the option is exercised to create additional return.

Usually, the final payout is the amount invested, plus the gain in the underlying stock or index times a note-specific participation rate, which can be more or less than 100%. For example, if the underlying equity gains 50% during the investment period and the participation rate is 80%, the investor receives 1.40 dollars for each dollar invested. If the equity remains unchanged or declines, the investor still receives one dollar per dollar invested (as long as the issuer does not default). Generally, the participation rate is better in longer maturity notes, since the total amount of interest given up by the investor is higher.

See also
Convertible bond
Exchangeable bond
Structured product
 Structured note
 Floating rate note
 Inverse floating rate note
 Credit-linked note
 Market-linked note

References

External links
Equity-Linked Notes: An Introduction
Equity-Linked Note (ELN) on Amex.com
Equity Linked Note Structures article on Financial-edu.com

Financial markets
Equity securities
Interest-bearing instruments